El Bar TV was the local version of the reality show The Bar in Argentina. The show had 2 seasons. América TV was the channel which aired it. The host was Andy Kusnetzoff.

Season 1
Start Date: 18 March 2001
End Date: 2 June 2001
Duration: 77 days
Contestants:
The Finalists: Federico (The Winner) & Eduardo (Runner-up)
Evicted Contestants: Alejandra, Celeste, César, Daniel, Estrella, Juan Pablo, Julieta, Maximiliano, Mónica & Yael.

Contestants

Nominations

Season 2
Start Date: 8 October 2001
End Date: 26 December 2001
Duration: 80 days
Contestants:
The Finalists: Diego (The Winner) & Tamir (Runner-up)
Evicted Contestants: Cecilia, Christian, Eugenia, Franco, Guillermina, Luciano, Marcelo, Mónica, Pamela, Sabrina & Viviana
Voluntary Exit: Nicolás

Contestants

Nominations

Ratings
Neither the first and neither the second season of the programme had much success, but the show was the most watched in América TV during 2001.

References

Argentine reality television series